Santiago Andrés Mele Castañero (born 6 September 1997) is a Uruguayan professional footballer who plays as a goalkeeper for Argentine Primera División club Unión de Santa Fe, on loan from Plaza Colonia.

Club career
A youth academy graduate of Fénix, Mele made his professional debut on 30 August 2016 in a 1–0 loss against Cerro.

On 4 September 2017, Turkish top division club Osmanlıspor announced the signing of Mele on a five-year deal. He was immediately loaned out to second division club Ankaragücü for 2017–18 season. However, with Korcan Çelikay and Altay Bayındır ahead of him in pecking order, he didn't receive any playing minutes.

Mele's loan was cut short in following January and he subsequently got loaned out to Spanish third division side Lleida Esportiu. With Diego Rivas Rego as first-choice goalkeeper, Mele failed to find playing minutes again.

Two years after joining the club, Mele made his debut for Osmanlıspor on 17 August 2019 in a 2–1 win against Boluspor.

International career
Mele is a former Uruguay youth international. He was part of Uruguay under-20 team which won 2017 South American U-20 Championship and finished fourth at 2017 FIFA U-20 World Cup. He was also part of Uruguay under-22 team which finished fourth at 2019 Pan American Games.

On 21 October 2022, Mele was named in Uruguay's 55-man preliminary squad for the 2022 FIFA World Cup.

Career statistics

Club

Honours
Uruguay U20
 South American Youth Football Championship: 2017

Individual
 Uruguayan Primera División Team of the Year: 2021

References

External links
 

1997 births
Living people
Footballers from Montevideo
Association football goalkeepers
Uruguayan footballers
Uruguay under-20 international footballers
Uruguay youth international footballers
Uruguayan Primera División players
Centro Atlético Fénix players
Ankaraspor footballers
MKE Ankaragücü footballers
Lleida Esportiu footballers
Plaza Colonia players
Unión de Santa Fe footballers
Uruguayan expatriate footballers
Uruguayan expatriate sportspeople in Turkey
Uruguayan expatriate sportspeople in Spain
Uruguayan expatriate sportspeople in Argentina
Expatriate footballers in Turkey
Expatriate footballers in Spain
Expatriate footballers in Argentina
Uruguayan people of Italian descent